Torrie Andrew Robertson (born August 2, 1961) is a Canadian former ice hockey player who played for the Washington Capitals, Hartford Whalers and Detroit Red Wings of the National Hockey League.

Career 
Drafted in 1980 by the Capitals, Robertson was traded to the Whalers in 1983. Primarily known as an enforcer, he is the Whalers' all-time penalty minutes leader with 1,368. He was a member of the WHL Second All-Star Team in 1981.

Personal life 
Torrie is the brother of Geordie Robertson.

Career statistics

Regular season and playoffs

External links

Profile at hockeydraftcentral.com

References 

1961 births
Living people
Adirondack Red Wings players
Albany Choppers players
Canadian ice hockey left wingers
Detroit Red Wings players
Hartford Whalers players
Hershey Bears players
Ice hockey people from British Columbia
Nanaimo Clippers players
Rochester Americans players
Sportspeople from Victoria, British Columbia
Victoria Cougars (WHL) players
Washington Capitals draft picks
Washington Capitals players